"Vom Himmel hoch, o Engel, kommt" ("From Heaven on High The Angels Sing", literally: From Heaven on high, O angels, come), also known as "Susani", is a German Christmas carol. It was first printed in 1622 as an alternate text to an older melody. In eight stanzas of two lines each, the angels are requested to come from Heaven, bring their musical instruments, and play and sing of Jesus and Mary, and ultimately for peace for the people.

Different translations to English appear in various hymnals and in Maria von Trapp's book Around the Year with the Trapp family.

History 
The song appeared first as "Vom Himmel kompt / O Engel kompt" (From Heaven come, O angels come) in a Catholic collection of songs printed in Würzburg in 1622. Similar to the Advent song "O Heiland, reiß die Himmel auf", it belongs to a group of anonymous songs from the beginning of the 17th century which recent scholarship has attributed to Friedrich Spee, however without certainty. The song was reprinted in the 1623 hymnal Ausserlesene, catholische, geistliche Kirchengesäng of Jesuits in Cologne, by Peter von Brachel which is lost.

The song from the beginning of the Thirty Years War may have been a reaction to the troubles of the war. The melody was derived from a version of "Puer natus in Bethlehem" which appeared in 1616 in a hymnal in Paderborn. Its Latin text was replaced by new poetry, while the repeated parts such as "Eia, Susani" and "Alleluja" were kept.

The song was only rarely included in modern hymnals, such as some regional parts of the Protestant hymnal Evangelisches Gesangbuch (EG 542 in Bavaria and Thuringia, EG 538 in Hesse-Nassau, among others), and in the Cologne version of the Catholic hymnal Gotteslob as GL 736.

Several composers wrote choral settings of the song, including Carl Thiel, Hugo Distler, Rudolf Mauersberger and Erhard Mauersberger.

A translation "Come, Angels, Come! From Heaven Appear" was included in the Oxford Book of Carols (1928) and the New Oxford Book of Carols (1998). Another version, "From Heaven High, O Angels Come" was included by Maria von Trapp in her book Around the Year with the Trapp family. Other published translations include "Fom Heav'n on High, the Angels Sing" and "From Highest Heaven Come, Angels Come".

Theme 
The song invites the angels to come from Heaven to Earth to make music as cradle songs of the baby Jesus and his mother Mary. It comes from the tradition of Kindleinwiegen. In eight stanzas of two lines each, the angels are requested to come from Heaven, bring their instruments. While the first stanza mentions pipes and trumpets, the following two stanzas mention lutes, harps, violins, organ and strings. The following stanzas request that the music be heavenly, lovely and sweet. Each stanza ends with "sing of Jesus and Mary" ("von Jesus singt und Maria"). In the last stanza, the angels are requested to sing for peace for the people near and far, and praise God for ever.

1. Vom Himmel hoch, o Engel, kommt!
Eia, eia, susani, susani, susani,
kommt, singt und klingt, kommt, pfeift und trombt
Alleluja, alleluja.
Von Jesus singt und Maria.

2. Kommt ohne Instrumenten nit, eia ...
bringt Lauten, Harfen, Geigen mit. Alleluja ...

3. Lasst hören euer Stimmen viel, eia ...
mit Orgel- und mit Saitenspiel. Alleluja ...

4. Hier muss die Musik himmlisch sein, eia ...
weil dies ein himmlisch Kindelein. Alleluja ...

5. Die Stimmen müssen lieblich gehn, eia ...
und Tag und Nacht nicht stille stehn. Alleluja ...

6. Sehr süß muss sein der Orgel Klang, eia ...
süß über allen Vogelsang. Alleluja ...

7. Das Saitenspiel muss lauten süß, eia ...
davon das Kindlein schlafen muss. Alleluja ...

8. Singt Fried den Menschen weit und breit, eia ...
Gott Preis und Ehr in Ewigkeit. Alleluja ...

Literature 
 Ingeborg Weber-Kellermann: Das Buch der Weihnachtslieder. 10th edition. Atlantis, Zurich 2003, pp 58–59.

See also
 List of Christmas carols

References

External links 

 
 Vom Himmel hoch, o Engel kommt im Liederprojekt von SWR2 und Carus-Verlag
 „Vom Himmel hoch, o Engel, kommt“. Weihnachtslieder (6), faz.net, 6. Dezember 2013
 Vom Himmel hoch, o Engel kommt Liederlexikon
 Sigfried Schibli: "Vom Himmel hoch" / Wie Martin Luther mit seinem Lied in Widerspruch zu sich selbst geriet (in German) Aargauer Zeitung 23 December 2011
 Monika Willer: Liederprojekt / Jeden Tag ein neues Adventslied – singen Sie mit! NRZ 25 November 2016

German-language Christmas carols
17th-century hymns in German